Bhaichung Bhutia Football Schools (BBFS) is a football youth development initiative by Bhaichung Bhutia, the former Indian football team captain, in association with Football by Carlos Queiroz (FBCQ), the Portuguese football academy by Carlos Queiroz. BBFS aims to cater to children in the age group of 5 to 15 years and deliver coaching experience under the guidance of senior coaches from Portugal through their partnership with FBCQ. As per Bhutia, BBFS is planned to be an all-inclusive venture where 20–30% of the enrolled students at BBFS are targeted to be from underprivileged sections of the society.

Launch 
BBFS was launched on 30 October 2010, in a press conference held at the Shangrila hotel in New Delhi by Bhaichung Bhutia and Tiago Lopes (CEO, FBCQ). BBFS started regular coaching in Delhi on 29 November 2010 at Ryan International School, and now have 5 centers in the Delhi NCR region. They have currently opened a new centre in Mumbai.It is located in a suburban part of Mumbai in Gorai . The name of the current school in Mumbai is Dr Pillai Global Academy.

Academy accreditation 
As per the All India Football Federations' (AIFF) Academy Accreditation Program, Bhaichung Bhutia Football Schools secured Academy Accreditation from four cities for the 2019–2020 season. BBFS Delhi has been awarded 4 star rating by AIFF whereas BBFS Bengaluru & BBFS Chandigarh have been awarded 1 star rating respectively. BBFS via a strategic and technical partnership with Somaiya Sports Academy (Mumbai) has received a 2 star rating by the AIFF and participated in the AIFF Youth Leagues as Somaiya Sports Academy for the 2019–2020 season. As such BBFS happens to be the only academy in the country to secure accreditation from four cities in the country and plans are underway to register two more regions, Kerala and Hyderabad in the AIFF academy accreditation 2020–2021.

Residential academies 
Apart from its Non-Residential football institutions across the country, Bhaichung Bhutia Football Schools also boasts of two Residential Academies situated in Gurgaon (Haryana) and Nilambur (Kerala) respectively. These Residential Academies serve as an ideal platform for young players wanting to pursue professional football along with their academics. Both the Residential Schools are equipped with state of the art facilities for football as well as dedicated CBSE curriculum academic programs. Some of the notable alumni of its Residential Academies are Ranjan Soren & Lionel Rymee.

Admission to these residential academies are done through a series of scouting programmes conducted throughout the country by the BBFS Technical and Management personnel. In December 2019 BBFS also initiated the 'Prince of Football' project in association with the Sports and Youth Affairs (S&YA) Department, Government of Sikkim. Prince of Football is a collaborative initiative, where a rigorous process of selection from block level to district level and final to state level will pave the way to select talented footballers that will form a Sikkim team which will go on to play at national level tournaments organized by the BBFS.

Garhwal F.C. 
Garhwal F.C. (formerly Garhwal Heroes F.C.) is an Indian football club formed in 1953 in New Delhi. The club via a strategic tie up currently operates under the aegis of Bhaichung Bhutia Football Schools – the largest and most reputed football youth development setup in India.

Garhwal F.C. provides BBFS the platform to lay down a pathway for player development in the senior categories. Through the club, BBFS players will be able to further their passion for football by playing professionally in the club.

Garwhal F.C. emerged champions of the Delhi Senior League in 2018-2019 and subsequently qualified to play in the 2nd Division Hero I – League for the 2019–2020 season. The team is currently placed at the top of the table in the group standings before the COVID-19 pandemic brought about a halt to the AIFF National Leagues in the country. In Garhwal's 67 year old heritage, it has been the first time that the club has participated in the National League with 9 of its players promoted from BBFS' youth development programme.

Social responsibility 
Bhaichung Bhutia's vision that "no talented Indian kid should be deprived of good coaching facilities for want of money or other resources" led to the establishment of the Indian Football Foundation (IFF) which is a sister organization to BBFS. It is one of the first not-for-profit organizations in India that is specifically focused on supporting talented young footballers from economically weaker sections to develop into professional footballers in an organized manner. Funds are raised to aid underprivileged young footballers with a 100 percent scholarship to provide them with quality coaching through BBFS. The IFF through its strategic tie ups with the NGOs & Government bodies focuses on talent identification through its scouting program and talent nurturing via the IFF – BBFS Scholarship Program.

References

External links 
 BBFS's website
 BBFS's website
https://www.the-aiff.com/club/11397?type=academy

Sports organizations established in 2010